I Spit on Your Graves is a 1946 crime novel by the French writer Boris Vian, published under the pseudonym Vernon Sullivan. The story is set in the United States and revolves around a sexual and racial conflict.

Reception
Chris Petit of The Guardian reviewed the book in 2001, and called it "dreamily convincing", elaborating: "A main inspiration would have been the slew of Hollywood movies that opened in Paris after the liberation, identified by the French as films noirs. I Spit... is straight noir, but also a work of liberated imagination after four years of Nazi occupation: heady, abandoned, fevered and lubricious. A fusion of prime US pulp and French sado-eroticism[.]"

Adaptation
The book was adapted into a film with the same title directed by Michel Gast. Vian had already publicly denounced the adaptation while it was in production, but attended the premiere on 23 June 1959. A few minutes into the screening, he stood up and began to shout out his dissatisfaction with the film, and while doing so, he collapsed and died from sudden cardiac death on the way to the hospital.

See also
 1946 in literature
 20th-century French literature
 Hardboiled

References

External links
J’irai cracher sur vos tombes, complete text in HTML, public domain in Canada
J'irai cracher sur vos tombes, complete text in PDF, public domain in Canada

1946 French novels
Novels by Boris Vian
French crime novels
Novels set in the United States
Works published under a pseudonym
French novels adapted into films